Surovy was one of 18 s (officially known as Project 7U) built for the Soviet Navy during the late 1930s. Although she began construction as a Project 7 , Surovy was completed in 1941 to the modified Project 7U design.

Entering service just before the beginning of Operation Barbarossa, she participated in minelaying operations and provided naval gunfire support from late June to early August. Engaging a German convoy without result on 21 August, she was damaged by a mine during the evacuation of Tallinn, Estonia, but limped back to Leningrad for repairs that lasted for most of September. After a month of shore bombardments during the Siege of Leningrad, the destroyer participated in the evacuation of Hanko Naval Base in early November, and was scuttled after being crippled by a mine during the latter on 13 November.

Design and description

Originally built as a Gnevny-class ship, Surovy and her sister ships were completed to the modified Project 7U design after Joseph Stalin, General Secretary of the Communist Party of the Soviet Union, ordered that the latter be built with their boilers arranged en echelon, instead of linked as in the Gnevnys, so that a ship could still move with one or two boilers disabled.

The crew complement of the Storozhevoy class numbered 207 in peacetime, but this increased to 271 in wartime, as more personnel were needed to operate additional equipment. Each ship had a pair of geared steam turbines, each driving one propeller, rated to produce  using steam from four water-tube boilers, which the designers expected would exceed the  speed of the Project 7s because there was additional steam available. Some fell short of it, although specific figures for most individual ships have not survived.

The Project 7U-class ships mounted four  B-13 guns in two pairs of superfiring single mounts fore and aft of the superstructure. Anti-aircraft defense was provided by a pair of  34-K AA guns in single mounts and three  21-K AA guns, as well as four  DK or DShK machine guns. They carried six  torpedo tubes in two rotating triple mounts amidships. The ships could also carry a maximum of 58 to 96 mines and 30 depth charges.

Construction and career 
Surovy was laid down at Shipyard No. 189 (Sergo Ordzhonikidze) in Leningrad as yard number 297 on 27 October 1936 as a Gnevny-class destroyer with the name Letuchy. She was relaid down as a Project 7U destroyer on 1 February 1939, and launched on 5 August 1939. Renamed Surovy on 25 September 1940, the ship was accepted by a state commission on 31 May 1941 and joined the 5th Destroyer Division of the Baltic Fleet on 18 June when the Soviet naval jack was raised aboard her. When Operation Barbarossa, the German invasion of the Soviet Union, began four days later, Surovy was still based at Kronstadt, quickly relocating to Tallinn. She participated in minelaying operations in the Gulf of Finland on 29 June, and bombarded German positions in support of the 8th Army on the coast of Narva Bay on 23 July. In the latter, the 186 main-gun rounds that the ship fired were credited with destroying five mortars and various structures.

During August, Surovy and her sister ship  made two raids in the Gulf of Riga; the former under the flag of Light Forces Detachment commander Counter Admiral Valentin Drozd. The destroyer bombarded a German battery at Salacgrīva, firing sixty 130 mm shells, on 6 August, and two days later fired 24 more shells at a pier in Roja. On the return voyage she evaded two German air attacks. With the old destroyer , she steamed to the Gulf of Riga on 21 August to intercept a convoy of two transports with escorts that had been spotted by aerial reconnaissance. Surovy fired one hundred forty-five 130 mm shells at one of the transports and erroneously reported its sinking, while escaping unscathed from German air attack as she was departing the area. While steaming from Moonsund to Tallinn on 27 August, the detonation of a mine in her paravanes caused a shockwave that damaged the foundation of boiler No. 3 and disabled other machinery. Another mine exploded in one of her paravanes during the Evacuation of Tallinn between 28 and 30 August, but the destroyer managed to reach Kronstadt. She was repaired at the Baltic Shipyard in Leningrad from 3 to 23 September, and Surovy bombarded German positions during the Siege of Leningrad after the completion of her repairs until the end of October, first from the Kronstadt roadstead and then from the Neva River, firing a total of 450 shells.

The destroyer, her sister , and smaller craft departed Kronstadt for the evacuation of the Hanko Naval Base on 3 November. Although Smetlivy was sunk by a mine on the return voyage, the remaining ships evacuated 1,200 of the Hanko defenders to Kronstadt and Leningrad. With the destroyer , the minelayer Ural, four minesweepers, six torpedo boats, and the submarine  she departed Kronstadt on 13 November to evacuate the remaining garrison of Hanko, on what proved to be her last voyage. After midnight, the ships ran into a minefield and early on 14 November Surovy collided with the stalled minesweeper T-217; the collision caused a  hole above her waterline. The latter was sealed with bedding, but minutes later her paravane detonated a mine  from the hull, knocking out power in several compartments and deforming the hull. This resulted in split seams, enabling flooding in her boiler and turbine rooms that created an eight-degree list to port after the turbofans and pumps failed. Although the crew extinguished a fire in one boiler room, raised steam in another, and restarted the turbogenerator and diesel generator in a machine room, the pumps could not cope with the flooding and the list reached twelve degrees at 05:00. As a result, her captain ordered the crew to abandon ship and about twenty minutes later they had been completely transferred to a minesweeper. The destroyer quickly sank after the explosion of her depth charges. Surovy was officially struck from the Navy List on 19 November.

Citations

Sources

Further reading

Storozhevoy-class destroyers
1939 ships
Ships built at the Baltic Shipyard